Sutton or 'South Farm' in old English, is a small village south of Campsall, at approximately 53° 36' 20" North, 1° 10' West, at an elevation of around 26 feet above sea level. It is in the Metropolitan Borough of Doncaster, in South Yorkshire, England. It is part of the civil parish of Norton. It lies west of Askern and south of Campsall.

From 1866 to 1938 Sutton was a separate civil parish. In 1931 the civil parish had a population of 156. It was then absorbed into the civil parish of Norton.

See also
 Listed buildings in Norton and Askern

References 

Villages in Doncaster
Former civil parishes in South Yorkshire
Norton, Doncaster